The Supreme Hockey League Championship (VHL-B) (Pervenstvo Vysshaya hokkeinaya liga) is an ice hockey league in Russia. It stands at the third-tier of the Russian ice hockey pyramid, below the second-level VHL and the top-tier KHL.

History
Since 1992, it was the First League of the Russian Ice Hockey Championship. During the 2010–11 season, it was known as the Championship of Russia between the club teams of regions (Pervenstvo Rossii sredi klubnykh komand regionov), which was considered a feeder league to both the KHL and the VHL. A majority of the teams were simply junior versions of their professional counterparts. During the era of the Soviet Championship League, it was referred to as "Class B"

The league in 2010–11 featured clubs from the 2009–10 season of the Pervaya Liga and also clubs from the 2009–10 season of the Vysshaya Liga that were not accepted into the VHL for 2010–11.

On August 23, 2011, the FHR announced the creation of the Russian Hockey League that replaced the Pervaya Liga. The league had 2 divisions. The West Division featured teams from both the Central and Povolzhie divisions of the Pervaya Liga. The East Division featured teams from the Ural and West Siberia division as well as teams from the Siberian and Far East division. The Russian Hockey League was also the same name of the organization responsible for organizing the top-tier hockey league of Russia at the time that existed from 1996 and 2008, when it was rebranded and reorganized as the Kontinental Hockey League.

Prior to the beginning of the 2014-15 season, there was a big decrease in league members (with seven teams either leaving to join a different league or disbanding altogether). In connection with this number of losses, FHR officials who ran the league were forced to combine the two territorial divisions into one league table.

After the 2014-15 season and prior to the 2015-16 season, the FHR transferred the organization of the RHL (which had seen its membership numbers plummet from 24 teams in 2011/12 to nine in 2014/15) to the Supreme Hockey League, with the hope of developing a better third-tier competition with an eventual promotion/relegation system with the second-level league thus creating the Supreme Hockey League Championship.

Prospects for expansion
It was planned to replenish the league from the following sources:
 VHL teams, for financial reasons, leaving the league.
 Foreign clubs. For example, interest to the league has been shown by representatives of Latvia.
 Teams from different cities of Russia.
 Independent teams of the MHL and/or the NMHL who left due to reorganization.

Teams for 2021–2022

Former teams

Champions

[*]: Both losing semifinalists received bronze medals
[NK]: Result not known

See also
Kontinental Hockey League
VHL
Junior Hockey League
NMHL

References

External links
 VHL-B Official website
 Inter-Regional Coordinating Council Siberia–Far East, responsible for the Siberia–Far East Division of Pervaya Liga
 Inter-Regional Coordinating Council Northwest, responsible for the Northwest Division of Pervaya Liga
 Inter-Regional Coordinating Council Povolzhye, responsible for the Povolzhye Division of Pervaya Liga
 Inter-Regional Coordinating Council Ural–West Siberia, responsible for the Ural–West Siberia Division of Pervaya Liga
 Euro Hockey

  
Rus
Sports leagues in Russia
Professional ice hockey leagues in Russia